Mariú is a Venezuelan telenovela produced by RCTV in 1999. It based on the telenovela La mujer sin rostro written by Julio César Mármol in 1984. Daniela Alvarado and Carlos Montilla starred as the main protagonists.

Synopsis 
María Eugenia Sampedro, simply known as Mariú is mistakenly caught up in the murder of Coralia Lozada de Gálvez, the beloved wife of Emiliano Gálvez. In a story of obsessive persecution, frustration, passion and desire, Mariú will fall in love with Emiliano, her prosecutor. She must choose between keeping the love of her life through silence or losing him by revealing her true identity.

Cast

References

External links
Mariú at the Internet Movie Database
Mariú Opening credits

2000 telenovelas
RCTV telenovelas
Venezuelan telenovelas
1999 Venezuelan television series debuts
2000 Venezuelan television series endings
Spanish-language telenovelas
Television shows set in Caracas